Finn Danielsen (born 19 April 1955) is a Danish sports shooter. He competed in the mixed 50 metre rifle three positions event at the 1980 Summer Olympics.

References

External links
 

1955 births
Living people
Danish male sport shooters
Olympic shooters of Denmark
Shooters at the 1980 Summer Olympics
People from Holstebro
Sportspeople from the Central Denmark Region